Aïn Mahdi is a district in Laghouat Province, Algeria. It was named after its capital, the natural gas extraction town of Hassi R'Mel.

Municipalities
The district is further divided into 2 municipalities

Hassi R'Mel
Hassi Delaâ

References

Districts of Laghouat Province